Ugochukwu Ogbonnaya Oduenyi (born 3 February 1996) is a Nigerian professional footballer who plays as a forward for Javor Ivanjica.

Career
Oduenyi started his career at famous Emmanuel Amuneke academy, Lagos, Nigeria.

Austria and Croatia
In August 2018, Oduenyi left the shores of Nigeria and signed with Austrian Bundesliga club LASK. He penned two-year deal with the Austrian club but was loaned to Croatian Second Football League club NK Sesvete.

In October 2018 he made his debut for Sesvete in the Croatian Second Football League when he came on as a substitute for Mario Vasilj in the 60th minute against NK BSK Bijelo Brdo on matchday eight of the 2018–19 season. The loan ended during the winter break of that season.

Oduenyi moved on loan to 2. Liga club SV Horn in January 2019. He made his debut in the second division with SV Horn in February 2019, when he was in the starting line-up against FC Liefering on matchday 16 of that season and was replaced by Kelvin Arase in the 58th minute.

In September 2019, Oduenyi signed permanently with another Austrian club SV Ried in the second division. He was part of the team success to gain promotion to the Austrian Bundesliga in 2020 and was released after contract expiration.

Ukraine and Kazakhstan
In January 2021, Oduenyi signed for Mynai to join Ukraine Premier League team as a free player and was handed a famous No. 9 jersey. Oduenyi made his debut for Mynai on 13 February 2021.

On 25 August 2021, Zhetysu announced the signing of Oduenyi.

References

External links

1996 births
Living people
Nigerian footballers
Association football forwards
Ukrainian Premier League players
Kazakhstan Premier League players
FC Mynai players
FC Zhetysu players
Nigerian expatriate footballers
Nigerian expatriate sportspeople in Ukraine
Expatriate footballers in Ukraine
Nigerian expatriate sportspeople in Kazakhstan
Expatriate footballers in Kazakhstan